The 2019 Calgary Stampeders season was the 62nd season for the team in the Canadian Football League and their 85th overall. The Stampeders finished with a 12–6 record and hosted the West Semi-Final game in a year where they were also hosting the 107th Grey Cup. Having lost to the Blue Bombers team in the aforementioned playoff game, however, the Stampeders failed to repeat as Grey Cup champions in 2019, marking the first time since 2011 where the Stampeders failed to reach the West Division Final and only the second time since their 2008 Championship-Winning Season. Despite the loss in the opening round of the postseason, the Stampeders qualified for the playoffs for the 15th consecutive year with a week 15 win over the Toronto Argonauts coupled with a loss by the Ottawa Redblacks, the playoff berth being clinched on September 21, 2019. It is the longest playoff streak in franchise history and tied for the fifth-longest streak in CFL history. The 2019 season marked Dave Dickenson's fourth season as head coach and John Hufnagel's 12th season as general manager.

Offseason

Foreign drafts
For the first time in its history, the CFL held drafts for foreign players from Mexico and Europe. Like all other CFL teams, the Stampeders held three non-tradeable selections in the 2019 CFL–LFA Draft, which took place on January 14, 2019. The 2019 European CFL Draft took place on April 11, 2019 where all teams held one non-tradeable pick.

CFL draft
The 2019 CFL Draft took place on May 2, 2019. By virtue of winning the 106th Grey Cup, the Stampeders had the last selection in each of the eight rounds. The team acquired another fourth-round pick after trading Charleston Hughes to the Hamilton Tiger-Cats.

Preseason

Schedule

Regular season

Standings

Schedule

Post-season

Schedule

Team

Roster

Coaching staff

References

External links
 

Calgary Stampeders seasons
2019 Canadian Football League season by team
2019 in Alberta